Lahijan-e Sharqi Rural District is in Lajan District of Piranshahr County, West Azerbaijan province, Iran. At the National Census of 2006, its population was 14,537 in 2,443 households. There were 15,592 inhabitants in 3,306 households at the following census of 2011. At the most recent census of 2016, the population of the rural district was 13,202 in 2,980 households. The largest of its 58 villages was Pasveh, with 3,495 people.

References 

Piranshahr County

Rural Districts of West Azerbaijan Province

Populated places in West Azerbaijan Province

Populated places in Piranshahr County